LFN may refer to:
 La Familia Network, US Spanish TV network
 La Femme Nikita (TV series)
 Lingua Franca Nova, a constructed language
 Long fat network, a data network with large bandwidth-delay
 Long filename, longer than 8.3 bytes in Microsoft FAT